Clark Mountain is a summit in Androscoggin County, Maine, in the United States.

Clark Mountain was named for Ephraim Clark, a pioneer who settled near its base.

References

Mountains of Androscoggin County, Maine
Mountains of Maine